Pam Lychner State Jail is a Texas Department of Criminal Justice state jail for men located in Atascocita, unincorporated northeast Harris County, Texas, United States, east of Humble. It is 20 miles northeast of Downtown Houston.

In July 1995, the jail, initially the Atascocita State Jail, opened. After Pam Lychner, a victim's rights activist, died on board TWA Flight 800 with her daughters on July 17, 1996, the TDCJ board unanimously voted to rename the facility to Pam Lychner State Jail.

The Pam Lychner State Jail, along with the Joe Kegans State Jail, serves state jail offenders from Harris County. Lychner and Kegans have the same wardens and management. As of 2001 Lychner serves higher risk and special needs offenders. By classification the unit has low risk, medium risk, high risk, and security risk offenders.

A statue of Lychner and her daughters is located outside of the state jail grounds.

References

External links

 Pam Lychner State Jail

Buildings and structures in Harris County, Texas
Prisons in Texas
1995 establishments in Texas